This is an incomplete List of ghost towns in Massachusetts. Ghost towns can include sites in various states of disrepair and abandonment. Some sites no longer have any trace of civilization and have reverted to pasture land or empty fields. Other sites are unpopulated but still have standing buildings. Some sites may even have a sizable, though small population, but there are far fewer citizens than in its grander historic past.

Classification

Barren site 

 Sites no longer in existence
 Sites that have been destroyed
 Covered with water
 Reverted to pasture
 May have a few difficult to find foundations/footings at most

Neglected site 

 Only rubble left
 All buildings uninhabited
 Roofless building ruins
 Some buildings or houses still standing, but majority are roofless

Abandoned site 

 Building or houses still standing
 Buildings and houses all abandoned
 No population, except caretaker
 Site no longer in existence except for one or two buildings, for example old church, grocery store

Semi abandoned site 

 Building or houses still standing
 Buildings and houses largely abandoned
 few residents
 many abandoned buildings
 Small population

Historic community 

 Building or houses still standing
 Still a busy community
 Smaller than its boom years
 Population has decreased dramatically, to one fifth or less.

List by county

Barnstable County
 Long Point
 Whitewash Village

Berkshire County
 Questing

Bristol County
 Norton Furnace

Essex County
 Dogtown

Franklin County
 Catamount 
 Davis 
 Hillsboro

Hampshire County
 Enfield, which was submerged to form Quabbin Reservoir. 
 Greenwich, which was submerged to form Quabbin Reservoir.
 Prescott, which was submerged to form Quabbin Reservoir.

Middlesex County
 Haywardvill, a mill town established in the mid 19th century. By 1870 it was deep in decline. In 1894 it was turned into a park and would become Middlesex Fells Reservation.

Worcester County
 Dana, submerged to form Quabbin Reservoir.

Notes and references

 
Massachusetts
Ghost towns
Tourist attractions in Massachusetts
Ghost towns in Massachusetts